Philipp Otto Naegele (January 22, 1928 – January 31, 2011) was a United States-based violinist, violist and scholar.

Naegele was born in Stuttgart in January 1928. In 1939 he traveled on the Kindertransport to England to escape Hitler's regime and in 1940 he was reunited with his parents in New York City.

Though Naegele began his studies privately he was admitted to the High School of Music and Art, then on to Queens College and completed a doctorate in musicology at Princeton University. He also received a Fulbright Scholarship, allowing him to study at the Vienna Academy of Music under Franz Samohyl.

In 1956-64 he played with the Cleveland Orchestra. He taught at Smith College as well as being William R. Kenan Professor of Music Emeritus, teaching at Smith College and Amherst College.

He was known for his involvement with the Marlboro Music Festival, which he had performed at since its inception. At Marlboro College he was under the tutelage of Adolf Busch, who he called his "idol".

References

External links
 Official website

1928 births
Musicians from Stuttgart
2011 deaths
German classical violinists
Male classical violinists
German male violinists
German classical violists
20th-century classical violinists
20th-century German musicians
The High School of Music & Art alumni
20th-century German male musicians
Kindertransport refugees
20th-century violists